Red Bank, or Redbank, is an unincorporated town in Bowie County, Texas. According to the Handbook of Texas, the community had a population of 125 in 2000. It is part of the Texarkana metropolitan area.

History
Red Bank was first settled between 1830 to 1845 and was named for the red soil in the area. In 1901, the post office was established but closed a year later, with James Hubbard as the postmaster. By the 1980s, Red Bank had a church, two businesses, two cemeteries, and several scattered houses. In 2000, the town had 125 residents.

Geography

Education
The Hooks Independent School District serves students in Redbank.

References

Unincorporated communities in Bowie County, Texas
Unincorporated communities in Texas